Crveno Brdo may refer to:
 Crveno Brdo (Lukavac), a village in Lukavac, Bosnia and Herzegovina
 Crveno Brdo (Srebrenik), a village in Srebrenik, Bosnia and Herzegovina